Gushetfaulds railway station served the area of Mount Florida, Glasgow, Scotland, from 1885 to 1907 on the Gordon Street lines.

History 
The station was opened as Cathcart Road on 6 April 1885 by the Caledonian Railway. To the north was Gushetfaulds Carriage Shed and its sidings. Its name was changed to Gushetfaulds on 1 July 1886, although its name sometimes appeared as Glasgow Cathcart Road in the timetable. The station closed on 1 May 1907.

References 

Disused railway stations in Glasgow
Former Caledonian Railway stations
Railway stations in Great Britain opened in 1885
Railway stations in Great Britain closed in 1907
1885 establishments in Scotland
1907 disestablishments in Scotland